Ramakant Madhvi is Shiv Sena Politician from Thane district, Maharashtra. He is the current Deputy Mayor of Thane Municipal Corporation.

Positions held
 2017: Elected as corporator in Thane Municipal Corporation 
 2017: Elected as Deputy Mayor of Thane Municipal Corporation

References

External links
 Shivsena Home Page
 ठाणे महानगरपालिका पदाधिकारी

Living people
Shiv Sena politicians
People from Thane district
Marathi politicians
Maharashtra politicians
Year of birth missing (living people)